Josh Wiggins (born November 2, 1998) is an American actor, best known for his role of Jacob Wilson in the drama Hellion (2014), Justin Wincott in the adventure drama Max (2015) and Franky Winter in Giant Little Ones (2018).

Early life
Wiggins was born on November 2, 1998, in Houston, Texas, to Jennifer and Steve Wiggins. Wiggins has two older brothers, Jacob and Luke.

Career
In 2014, Wiggins made his feature film debut as the lead role of Jacob Wilson in the drama Hellion with Aaron Paul and Juliette Lewis, and directed by Kat Candler. The film premiered at Sundance Film Festival on January 17, 2014, and released domestically on June 13, 2014. His performance in the film was praised by several critics.

In 2015, Wiggins starred as Justin Wincott in the adventure drama Max with Dejon LaQuake, Thomas Haden Church, and Robbie Amell, about Max, a dog starring in the titular role. The film was directed by Boaz Yakin and released domestically on June 26, 2015, by Warner Bros. Pictures. Also in 2015, Wiggins co-starred as Louis in the action-thriller film Lost in the Sun with Josh Duhamel. In 2017, he starred in the survival drama Walking Out and the drama movie The Bachelors.

Wiggins next played the lead role of Franky Winter in Keith Behrman’s coming of age story Giant Little Ones. The film's critically acclaimed screenplay explored present-day complexities of sexual identity and was released in 2018 and 2019 (Canada and the United States respectively).

Filmography

Film

References

External links
 
 

1998 births
21st-century American male actors
American male child actors
American male film actors
Living people
Male actors from Houston